Keswick Barracks is a barracks of the Australian Army in Keswick, South Australia. The barracks are located on Anzac Highway adjacent to the Royal Adelaide Showgrounds. The base is separated from the Showgrounds by the Seaford and Belair railway lines.

The barracks' historic Headquarters Building is listed on both the Australian Commonwealth Heritage List and the former Register of the National Estate. The barracks is also home to the Army Museum of South Australia.

Current units
9th Brigade
10th/27th Battalion, Royal South Australia Regiment
3rd Health Support Battalion
144 Signals Squadron 
47 Army Cadet Unit
413 Army Cadet Unit (Pipes & Drums).
601 Squadron Australian Air Force Cadets

Previous Units
48th Field Battery

References

Barracks in Australia
Military installations in South Australia
Keswick, South Australia